Distichochlamys is a genus of plants in the ginger family. It has 4 known species, all endemic to Vietnam.

 Distichochlamys benenica Q.B.Nguyen & Skornick.
 Distichochlamys citrea M.F.Newman
 Distichochlamys orlowii K.Larsen & M.F.Newman
 Distichochlamys rubrostriata W.J.Kress & Rehse

References

External links
 Smithsonian National Museum of Natural History, genera of the Zingiberales, Distichochlamys

Zingiberoideae
Zingiberaceae genera
Endemic flora of Vietnam